Ferdinando Coppola (born 10 June 1978) is a former Italian professional footballer who played as a goalkeeper.

Career

Early career
Coppola's career began at native club S.S.C. Napoli, he was used as a backup goalkeeper for Giuseppe Taglialatela, Luca Mondini and Alessio Bandieri. In June 2000, he joined A.S. Roma, He was the backup of Francesco Antonioli.

Ascoli
He transferred to Serie B team Ascoli Calcio 1898 in the summer of 2003, making one appearance before being sent to Serie A team Reggina Calcio on loan, playing further two games.

He returned to Ascoli in 2004, and made 28 appearances, plus 2 more in play-offs, helping Ascoli achieve promotion back to Serie A. During the 2005–06 season, Coppola played all of the 38 Serie A fixtures, and saw Ascoli finish twelfth place in the table.

Milan and Piacenza
Coppola was signed by A.C. Milan in June 2006, for €200,000, as a replacement for their third choice goalkeeper Valerio Fiori, who was set to retire from professional football. Coppola was to compete with Željko Kalac for this position.

He played a few friendly matches with A.C. Milan, but was sent back to Serie B, to play for Piacenza Calcio, because Fiori delayed his retirement.

Atalanta
In the summer of 2007, he was loaned to Atalanta in Serie A.

In June 2008, Atalanta bought half of the rights from Milan for €750,000.

Siena
After Atalanta were relegated, Milan bought him back for €200,000 and loaned him to Siena. Two days later Siena sold Gianluca Curci to Sampdoria.

Torino
On 30 June 2011, Torino announced the signing of Coppola on a temporary basis from Milan. Before the start of the 2012–13, Coppola was sentenced to a six-month ban, later reduced to four months on appeal, for his involvement in the 2011–12 Italian football scandal. After serving the ban, during the January transfer window he re-joined Torino, this time on a permanent deal.

Back in Milan
On 19 August 2013, he was re-signed by Milan.

Bologna
On 8 July 2014 Coppola moved to Bologna.

Career statistics

References

External links
 Profile at assocalciatori.it 

1978 births
Living people
Italian footballers
S.S.C. Napoli players
Bologna F.C. 1909 players
Reggina 1914 players
Ascoli Calcio 1898 F.C. players
A.C. Milan players
Piacenza Calcio 1919 players
Atalanta B.C. players
A.C.N. Siena 1904 players
Torino F.C. players
Hellas Verona F.C. players
Serie A players
Serie B players
Association football goalkeepers
Footballers from Naples